A beta solenoid is a protein fold composed of repeating beta strands subunits, arranged in antiparallel fashion to form a superhelix.

Terminology and classification
Beta solenoids are part of the solenoid class of protein tandem repeats.

Structure
Beta solenoids are elongated and potentially open-ended protein repeats characterized by beta strands winding around an imaginary axis, where the beta sheets are formed by sequences of consecutive repeat units.

External links 
RepeatsDB β-solenoid class

References

Protein tandem repeats

Protein domains